Paris–Roubaix Espoirs is a one-day road cycling race held annually in France. In 2005 the race was integrated into the UCI Europe Tour as a category 1.2U race.

Held since 1967, it is the under-23 version of the Monument classic Paris–Roubaix and finishes at the Roubaix Velodrome. Winners who went on to become famous professionals include Yaroslav Popovych, Thor Hushovd, Stephen Roche, and Frédéric Moncassin.

Winners

References

Cycle races in France
UCI Europe Tour races
Recurring sporting events established in 1967
1967 establishments in France